The Gilchrist–Thomas process or Thomas process is a historical process for refining pig iron, derived from the Bessemer converter. It is named after its inventors who patented it in 1877: Percy Carlyle Gilchrist and his cousin Sidney Gilchrist Thomas . By allowing the exploitation of phosphorous iron ore, the most abundant, this process allowed the rapid expansion of the steel industry outside the United Kingdom and the United States.

The process differs essentially from the Bessemer process in the refractory lining of the converter. The latter, being made of dolomite fired with tar, is basic, whereas the Bessemer lining, made of packed sand, is acidic. Phosphorus, by migrating from iron to slag, allows both the production of a metal of satisfactory quality, and of phosphates sought after as fertilizer, known as "Thomas meal". The disadvantages of the basic process includes larger iron loss and more frequent relining.

After having favored the spectacular growth of the Lorraine iron and steel industry, the process progressively faded away in front of the Siemens-Martin open hearth, which also used the benefit of basic refractory lining, before disappearing in the mid-1960s: with the development of gas liquefaction, the use of pure oxygen became economically viable. Even if modern pure oxygen converters all operate with a basic medium, their performance and operation have little to do with their ancestor.

See also 
 Bessemer process

Bibliographic sources 
 G. Reginald Bashforth, The manufacture of iron and steel, vol. 2 : Steel production, Londres, Chapman & Hall Ltd, 1951, 461 p.
 Thomas Turner (dir.), The metallurgy of iron : By Thomas Turner... : Being one of a series of treatises on metallurgy written by associates of the Royal school of mines, C. Griffin & company, limited, coll. « Griffin's metallurgical series », 1908, 3e éd., 463 p. 
 Walter MacFarlane, The principles and practice of iron and steel manufacture, Longmans, Green, and Co, 1917, 5th ed.
 R.W. Burnie, Memoir and letters of Sidney Gilchrist Thomas, Inventor, John Murray, 1891
 William Tulloch Jeans, The Creators of the Age of Steel, 1884, 356 p. 
 Hermann Wedding (translated from German by: William B. Phillips, PH. D. & Ernst Prochaska), Wedding's basic Bessemer process [« Basische Bessemer - oder Thomas-Process »], New York Scientific Publishing Company, 1891, 224 p.
 Jean Duflot, Encyclopædia Universalis, « Sidérurgie »

British inventions
Steelmaking
Metallurgical processes
Chemistry